Wham Bam Thank You Ma'am is an Australian six-part sketch comedy television series that began screening on ABC2 on 8 December 2016.

Wham Bam Thank You Ma'am is written, directed and stars Adele Vuko, Greta Lee Jackson and Sarah Bishop. Guests include David Collins, Matt Okine, Christiaan Van Vuuren, Aunty Donna, Henry Stone, Paul Ayre and Veronica Milsom.

It is produced by Michelle Hardy and executive produced by Donna Andrew. Guest directors are Erin White, Nikos Andonicos and Kacie Anning.

See also 
 List of Australian television series

References

Australian Broadcasting Corporation original programming
Australian satirical television shows
2016 Australian television series debuts
English-language television shows
Australian television sketch shows